Night Train is writer-director Diao Yinan's second feature film.  Like his previous film, Uniform, Night Train takes place in Diao's home province of Shaanxi and was shot in and around Baoji.

Night Train premiered in the 2007 Cannes Film Festival as part of the Un Certain Regard competition and was one of only two Asian films (the other being Li Yang's Blind Mountain) in competition for an award. The film was produced by Diao's Beijing-based Ho-Hi Pictures with funding from French (Fonds Sud Cinema) and American (DViant Films) companies.

Plot 
The film follows a young woman, Wu Hongyan (Liu Dan), who works as a prison guard who aids in the execution of female prisoners. Lonely and widowed, Wu finds herself taking the night train to a dating service in a neighboring city.

After a series of unsuccessful dates, she meets Li Jun (Qi Dao), with whom she begins a relationship. It soon becomes clear that Li Jun is hiding a secret: that he is the widower of one of Wu's executed prisoners. Li Jun is torn both by his attraction to Wu, but also his desire to exact some sort of vengeance. Wu, meanwhile, must consider her own safety in this new volatile relationship.

Cast 
 Liu Dan as Wu Hongyan, a widow, now working on the execution 
 Qi Dao as Li Jun, the husband to one of Wu's executed inmates, Li Jun and Wu embark on an unstable sexual relationship
 Xu Wei as Wu's first date
 Wu Yuxi as Wu's second date
 Wang Zhenjia as Wu's girlfriend
 Meng Haiyan as a new prisoner

Reception

Awards and nominations
2007 Warsaw International Film Festival
 Nescafe Grand Prix
2008 Buenos Aires International Festival of Independent Cinema
 Best Actress — Liu Dan
 Jury Special Prize

References

External links 

Night Train from the Chinese Movie Database
Night Train from distributor Mk2

2007 films
Chinese drama films
Films directed by Diao Yinan
Films set in the 2000s
Films set in Shaanxi
Films shot in China 
2000s Mandarin-language films
Rail transport films
2000s thriller films